1893 in Argentine football saw the first league tournament organized by current Argentine Football Association. This league had been established by Alexander Watson Hutton, considered "the father" of Argentine football. Lomas Athletic Club won its first title.

Only Buenos Aires al Rosario Railway survived from the 1891 championship.

Primera división

The championship took the format of a league of 5 teams, with each team playing the other twice.

Argentine Association Football League

1 It was registered as the football team of the School. The English High School Athletic Club would be established in 1898.

References

 
Seasons in Argentine football
Argentine
1893 in South American football